Dungeon Floor Plans is a supplement for fantasy role-playing games published by Games Workshop in 1978.

Contents
Dungeon Floor Plans is a GM's aid: sheets of dungeon floors, passages, stairs, etc., for use with 25mm miniatures. It is also suitable for use with AD&D. It was a set of terrain tiles intended to combine together to form various locations.

Dungeon Floor Plans is a package that contains twelve thick cardboard sheets, each printed (in color) to represent flagstone flooring (tan), rough stone and dirt flooring (grey), wood (brown) and stone stairways (grey). The sheets are gridded into squares, and the lines have been incorporated into the design. The squares are to scale for 25mm figures, each being just over 2 cm x 2 cm and representing an area 5' x 5'. The DM can cut the sheets to create a continuous series of rooms and corridors covering an entire table-top.

Publication history
Dungeon Floor Plans was published by Games Workshop in 1979 as 12 color cardstock sheets.

As Games Workshop expanded its publishing arm beyond White Dwarf and reprints of American products. among their first original products were a pad of character sheets (1978), a pad of hex sheets (1978), and the Dungeon Floor Plans (1979) gaming accessory, each of which carried the Dungeons & Dragons trademark, and were some of the few licensed D&D products ever authorized by TSR. Games Workshop later reprinted the Dungeon Floor Plans in 1982 – no longer sporting the D&D logo – as the first of several gaming supplements.

Games Workshop later produced a set of compatible Dungeon Mapping Sheets in 1982, as a grid is of 2.5mm squares.

Reception
Peter Darvill-Evans reviewed Dungeon Floor Plans for White Dwarf #13, and rated it a 9 out of 10. He commented that "From a distance, the front of the package looks like an early 1950s television made of bright orange bakelite, with a bad case of interference right across the screen! I suppose it is eyecatching. The back, on the other hand, is very informative, giving a complete description of the Dungeon Floor Plans, a clear diagram, and instructions for use." Darvill-Evans continued by saying "These sheets are not, of course, floor plans in themselves. The idea is that the DM should cut up the sheets and use pieces to lay out sections of his dungeon for the benefit of the players to map his dungeon and/or move their character figures along. An infinite number of dungeon sections can be created, suitable for any role-playing game or small-scale combat simulation, but specifically "endorsed by TSR Hobbies, Inc. for use with Original, Basic or Advanced Dungeons & Dragons"." He added: "considering it is all in two dimensions, the effect is incredibly realistic – the floors are cracked, the wood has a grain to it, the stairs even have shadows to indicate whether they are ascending or descending. A half-square of wood can be used as a table, or a chest, or as a door which, when placed between the corridor and room sections, automatically forms a wall-thickness of 2 ½' scale. After years of feeling very out of place on a bright green Cul-de-Sac board, and even sometimes simply roaming across a deserted table, my characters can at last look quite at home on a playing surface that looks attractive, is easy to use, adds atmosphere to the game, and, not least, speeds up and simplifies combat." Darvill-Evans stated that "There are only two possible criticisms: firstly, that laying out a complete dungeon area might make it too easy to map, and secondly, that the wall-thickness formed by the doors have to be allowed for by the DM in his original plan to avoid distortion." He commented that "Other companies have tried to create this type of playing aid before – Dungeon Decor and The Endless Dungeon are two titles which come to mind, and I'm sure there are others – but Dungeon Floor Plans are far the best designed and most usable product, and, within the limitations of the cardboard, I can't think how they can be much improved." Darvill-Evans concluded his review by saying, "They are sure to become an essential part of every DM's equipment, and at the price are a worthwhile investment."

Doug Cowie reviewed Dungeon Mapping Sheets for Imagine magazine, and stated that "These are intended for larger scale representations than the hex sheets (plans rather than maps) and are likely to be used mainly for dungeons, castles or villages. Until now most people will have used graph paper for these tasks."

Doug Cowie reviewed Dungeon Floor Plans 3 for Imagine magazine, and stated that "this is a good accessory which, if used with more preparation and forethought than the standard floor plans, will enhance the visual appeal of many outdoor adventures."

References

Fantasy role-playing game supplements
Role-playing game mapping aids
Role-playing game supplements introduced in 1978